Trolleholm Castle is a castle in Svalöv Municipality, Scania, in southern Sweden. The estate comprises 110 houses and a total of 12300 acres (5000 Hectare). Originally named Kattisnabbe and later Eriksholm, it has been known since 1424, and was a monastic estate in the late Middle Ages.

It belonged to members of the Thott family (1533-1680) and Trolle family (1680-1806). Frederik Trolle (1693-1770) gave it its present name in 1755. During 1806 was the estate by inheritance to the family, who still owns it. The holder of the estate carry the family name Trolle-Bonde.

In popular culture
Trolleholm Castle was chosen by Arrow Games to feature in their Scandinavian Series of jigsaws in the 1960-80s. It's definitely the same castle in their jigsaw as shown in all photos of Trolleholm, yet somehow they managed to rename it 'Trolleheim Castle' and place it in Norway. Given that all searches of Google and Google Maps for 'Trolleheim Castle, Norway' only bring references to the puzzle, this seems to be the only place it could have come from. The Trolleholm Castle used in an online jigsaw puzzle correctly identifies the castle as Swedish and shows the castle in a version which may be put together at the website.

See also
List of castles in Sweden
Trolleholms Estate Website

References

Ferdinand Meldahl buildings
Castles in Skåne County